Sunrayce 95 was an intercollegiate solar car race on June 20–29, 1995. The event was won by the Massachusetts Institute of Technology, with the University of Minnesota finishing less than 20 minutes behind them. It was the 3rd American national championship solar car race held.

Route
Day 1: Tue, June 20: Start in Indianapolis, Indiana; finish in Terre Haute, IN.
Day 2: Wed, June 21: Start in Terre Haute, IN, must reach Effingham, Illinois checkpoint, finish in Godfrey, IL.
Day 3: Thu, June 22: Start in Godfrey, IL, must reach Louisiana, Missouri checkpoint, finish in Fulton, MO.
Day 4: Fri, June 23: Start in Fulton, MO, must reach California, MO checkpoint, finish in Lee's Summit, MO.
Rest Day: Sat, June 24: Lee's Summit, MO.
Day 5: Sun, June 25: Start in Lee's Summit, MO, must reach Topeka, Kansas checkpoint, finish in Manhattan, KS.
Day 6: Mon, June 26: Start in Manhattan, KS, must reach Glasco, KS checkpoint, finish in Smith Center, KS.  
Day 7: Tue, June 27: Start in Smith Center, KS, must reach Oberlin, KS checkpoint, finish in St. Francis, KS.
Day 8: Wed, June 28: Tue, June 27: Start in St. Francis, KS, must reach Anton, Colorado checkpoint, finish in Aurora, CO.
Day 9: Thu, June 29: Start in Aurora, CO, finish in Golden, CO.

Results

Notes

References

1995 in American motorsport
Solar car races